José Márquez may refer to:

 José Ignacio de Márquez (1793–1880), Colombian statesman, lawyer, and professor
 Jose Midas Marquez (born 1966), court administrator and the Supreme Court spokesperson of the Philippines
 José Guadarrama Márquez ( 1978–2012), Mexican politician
 José Jesús Márquez ( 1994–1998), Spanish taekwando fighter
 José Bernando Márquez (born 1989), Puerto Rican attorney, activist, and politician
 Joseph Marquez (born 1991), professional Super Smash Bros. Melee player

See also
 José Marques da Silva (1869–1947), Portuguese architect and educator
 Josue Marquez (1946–2018), Puerto Rican boxer